The South African Business Party (SABP) assists people to plan their business, advises and guides business in regard to exporting, tax reduction, job creation and the like. In 2012, due to lack of funding, the group ceased to be a political party and transformed into an NGO named "South African People's Organization".

External links
 Official Site

Defunct political parties in South Africa
Political parties disestablished in 2012